Denys Molchanov and Sergiy Stakhovsky were the defending champions but chose not to defend their title.

Timur Khabibulin and Vladyslav Manafov won the title after defeating Sanjar Fayziev and Jurabek Karimov 6–2, 6–1 in the final.

Seeds

Draw

References

External links
 Main draw

Karshi Challenger - Doubles
2018 Doubles